William Harold "Butch" Cowell (July 21, 1887 – August 28, 1940) was an American football player and coach of football, basketball, and baseball. He is best known for his tenure as head coach of the New Hampshire Wildcats football team from 1915 to 1936.

Biography
Cowell was born on July 21, 1887, in Lynn, Massachusetts. His family moved to Clyde, Kansas, where he played high school football. He later played college football at Kansas, Illinois, and Pittsburgh.

Cowell served as the head coach of the University of New Hampshire's football team from 1915 to 1936, except in 1918 when no varsity team was fielded. As a football coach, Cowell led his varsity teams to an overall record of 87 wins, 68 losses, and 23 ties, for a  winning percentage. In addition to coaching football, Cowell was also the head basketball coach, head baseball coach, and athletic director at New Hampshire. He was a founder of the American Football Coaches Association and served a term as the organization's president.

New Hampshire's Wildcat Stadium was named Cowell Stadium in his honor from 1952 until 2016. He was a member of the inaugural class of the Wildcat athletic Hall of Fame in 1982. He is also the "Cowell" in the name of the rivalry game with the Maine Black Bears, the Battle for the Brice-Cowell Musket.

During World War I, he served as a second lieutenant in the Yankee Division (26th Infantry Division). Cowell, who never married, died on August 28, 1940, in Dover, New Hampshire, at the age of 53 after a two-year illness. He was interred at Maple Grove Cemetery in Randolph, Maine. His brother, Roland Cowell, was also a coach and administrator in college athletics.

Head coaching record
Note that New Hampshire did not adopt the Wildcats nickname until February 1926; before then, they were generally referred to as "the blue and white".

Football

 New Hampshire had an eight-game schedule planned for the 1918 season, which was abandoned due to World War I.

Source:

See also
List of college football coaches with 20 ties

Notes

References

External links
 

1887 births
1940 deaths
American football tackles
Basketball coaches from Kansas
Players of American football from Kansas
Coaches of American football from Kansas
Haskell Indian Nations Fighting Indians football coaches
Kansas Jayhawks football players
New Hampshire Wildcats athletic directors
New Hampshire Wildcats baseball coaches
New Hampshire Wildcats football coaches
New Hampshire Wildcats men's basketball coaches
People from Cloud County, Kansas
College men's basketball head coaches in the United States
United States Army personnel of World War I